The demographics of Mozambique describes the condition and overview of Mozambique's peoples. Demographic topics include basic education, health, and population statistics as well as identified racial and religious affiliations.

Population 

According to the 2022 revision of the world factbook the total population was 31,693,239 in 2022. The proportion of children below the age of 14 in 2020 was 45.57%, 51.5% was between 15 and 65 years of age, while 2.93% was 65 years or older. A population census took place in 2017, and the preliminary results indicate a population of 28 861 863 inhabitants.

Population Estimates by Sex and Age Group (01.VII.2020):

Vital statistics 
Registration of vital events is in Mozambique not complete. The website Our World in Data  prepared the following estimates based on statistics from the Population Department of the United Nations.

Also, according to a 2011 survey, the total fertility rate was 5.9 children per woman, with 6.6 in rural areas and 4.5 in urban areas.

Fertility and births 
Total Fertility Rate (TFR) (Wanted Fertility Rate) and Crude Birth Rate (CBR):

Fertility data by province (DHS Program):

Life expectancy

Ethnic groups 
Mozambique's major ethnic groups encompass numerous subgroups with diverse languages, dialects, cultures, and histories. Many are linked to similar ethnic groups living in inland countries.
The estimated 4 million Makua are the largest ethnic group of the country and are dominant in the northern part of the country — the Sena and Shona (mostly Ndau-Shangaan) are prominent in the Zambezi valley, and the Shangaan (Tsonga) dominate in southern Mozambique. Other groups include Makonde, Yao, Swahili, Tonga, Chopi, and Nguni (including Zulu). The country is also home to a growing number of white residents, most with Portuguese ancestry. During colonial rule, European residents hailed from every Mozambican province, and at the time of independence the total population was estimated at around 360,000. Most vacated the region after independence in 1975, emigrating to Portugal as retornados. There is also a larger mestiço minority with mixed African and Portuguese heritage. The remaining non-Blacks in Mozambique are primarily Indian Asiatics, who have arrived from Pakistan, Portuguese India, and numerous Arab countries. There are various estimates for the size of Mozambique's Chinese community, ranging from 1,500 to 12,000 .

Languages 

Portuguese is the official and most widely spoken language of the nation, but in 2017 only 47.4% of Mozambique's population speak Portuguese as either their first or second language, and only 16.6% speak Portuguese as their first language. Arabs, Chinese, and Indians speak their own languages (Indians from Portuguese India speak any of the Portuguese Creoles of their origin) aside from Portuguese as their second language. Most educated Mozambicans speak English, which is used in schools and business as second or third language.

Religion

Culture 

Despite the influence of Islamic coastal traders and European colonizers, the people of Mozambique have largely retained an indigenous culture based on smallscale agriculture. Mozambique's most highly developed art forms have been wood sculpture, for which the Makonde in northern Mozambique are particularly renowned, and dance. The middle and upper classes continue to be heavily influenced by the Portuguese colonial and linguistic heritage.

Education and health 
Under Portugal, educational opportunities for poor Mozambicans were limited; 93% of the Bantu population was illiterate, and many could not speak Portuguese. In fact, most of today's political leaders were educated in missionary schools. After independence, the government placed a high priority on expanding education, which reduced the illiteracy rate to about two-thirds as primary school enrollment increased. Unfortunately, in recent years school construction and teacher training enrollments have not kept up with population increases. With post-war enrollments reaching all-time highs, the quality of education has suffered. As a member of Commonwealth of Nations, most urban Mozambicans are required to learn English starting high-school.

Other demographic statistics 

Demographic statistics according to the World Population Review in 2022.

One birth every 27 seconds	
One death every 2 minutes	
One net migrant every 103 minutes	
Net gain of one person every 34 seconds

The following demographic are from the CIA World Factbook

Population
31,693,239 (2022 est.)
27,233,789  (July 2018 est.)

Religions
Roman Catholic 27.2%, Muslim 18.9%, Zionist Christian 15.6%, Evangelical/Pentecostal 15.3%, Anglican 1.7%, other 4.8%, none 13.9%, unspecified 2.5% (2017 est.)

Age structure
0-14 years: 45.57% (male 6,950,800/female 6,766,373)
15-24 years: 19.91% (male 2,997,529/female 2,994,927)
25-54 years: 28.28% (male 3,949,085/female 4,564,031)
55-64 years: 3.31% (male 485,454/female 509,430)
65 years and over: 2.93% (male 430,797/female 449,771) (2020 est.)

0-14 years: 44.52% (male 6,097,116 /female 6,028,416)
15-24 years: 21.6% (male 2,905,254 /female 2,977,732)
25-54 years: 27.62% (male 3,525,755 /female 3,995,264)
55-64 years: 3.37% (male 442,990 /female 475,900)
65 years and over: 2.88% (male 359,624 /female 425,738) (2018 est.)

Birth rate
37.47 births/1,000 population (2022 est.) Country comparison to the world: 10th
37.8 births/1,000 population (2018 est.) Country comparison to the world: 11th

Death rate
10.25 deaths/1,000 population (2022 est.) Country comparison to the world: 33rd
11.4 deaths/1,000 population (2018 est.)

Total fertility rate
4.81 children born/woman (2022 est.) Country comparison to the world: 12th
5.02 children born/woman (2018 est.) Country comparison to the world: 12th

Median age
total: 17 years. Country comparison to the world: 219th
male: 16.3 years
female: 17.6 years (2020 est.)

total: 17.3 years. Country comparison to the world: 220th
male: 16.7 years 
female: 17.8 years (2018 est.)

Population growth rate
2.56% (2022 est.) Country comparison to the world: 18th
2.46% (2018 est.) Country comparison to the world: 25th

Mother's mean age at first birth
19.2 years (2011 est.)
note: median age at first birth among women 20-49

18.9 years (2011 est.)
median age at first birth among women 25-29

Contraceptive prevalence rate
27.1% (2015)

Net migration rate
-1.58 migrant(s)/1,000 population (2022 est.) Country comparison to the world: 160th
-1.9 migrant(s)/1,000 population (2017 est.) Country comparison to the world: 160th

Urbanization

urban population: 38.2% of total population (2022)
rate of urbanization: 4.24% annual rate of change (2020-25 est.)

urban population: 36% of total population (2018)
rate of urbanization: 4.35% annual rate of change (2015-20 est.)

Net migration rate
-1.58 migrant(s)/1,000 population (2022 est.) Country comparison to the world: 160th
-1.9 migrants/1,000 population (2017)

Dependency ratios
total dependency ratio: 93.5 (2015 est.)
youth dependency ratio: 87.5 (2015 est.)
elderly dependency ratio: 6.1 (2015 est.)
potential support ratio: 16.5 (2015 est.)

Sex ratio
at birth: 1.03 male(s)/female (2003 est.), 1.02 male(s)/female (2007 est.)
under 15 years: 0.98 male(s)/female (2003 est.), 1.01 male(s)/female (2007 est.)
15-64 years: 0.95 male(s)/female (2003 est.), 0.949 male(s)/female (2007 est.)
65 years and over: 0.7 male(s)/female (2003 est.), 0.717 male(s)/female (2007 est.)
total population: 0.96 male(s)/female (2003 est.), 0.968 male(s)/female (2007 est.)

Life expectancy at birth
total population: 57.1 years. Country comparison to the world: 224th
male: 55.76 years
female: 58.49 years (2022 est.)

total population: 54.1 years
male: 53.3 years
female: 54.9 years (2018 est.)

HIV/AIDS — people living with HIV/AIDS: 2.1 million (2017 est.)
HIV/AIDS — deaths: 70,000 (2017 est.)

Major infectious diseases
degree of risk: very high (2020)
food or waterborne diseases: bacterial and protozoal diarrhea, hepatitis A, and typhoid fever
vectorborne diseases: malaria and dengue fever
water contact diseases: schistosomiasis
animal contact diseases: rabies

note: on 21 March 2022, the US Centers for Disease Control and Prevention (CDC) issued a Travel Alert for polio in Africa; Mozambique is currently considered a high risk to travelers for circulating vaccine-derived polioviruses (cVDPV); vaccine-derived poliovirus (VDPV) is a strain of the weakened poliovirus that was initially included in oral polio vaccine (OPV) and that has changed over time and behaves more like the wild or naturally occurring virus; this means it can be spread more easily to people who are unvaccinated against polio and who come in contact with the stool or respiratory secretions, such as from a sneeze, of an “infected” person who received oral polio vaccine; the CDC recommends that before any international travel, anyone unvaccinated, incompletely vaccinated, or with an unknown polio vaccination status should complete the routine polio vaccine series; before travel to any high-risk destination, CDC recommends that adults who previously completed the full, routine polio vaccine series receive a single, lifetime booster dose of polio vaccine

Nationality
noun:
Mozambican(s)
adjective:
Mozambican

Ethnic groups
Indigenous tribal groups (including the Shangana, Chokwe, Manyika, Sena, Makua, Ndau, among others) make up 98.61% of Mozambique's total population. People of mixed race are the largest minority, totaling 0.84% from the remaining figure, while Portuguese Mozambicans and Mozambicans of Indian descent  represent 0.36% and 0.2% of the population respectively . There are noteworthy Chinese and Arab communities.

Languages
Portuguese language (official)
Emakhuwa 26.1%, Xichangana 11.3%, Portuguese 8.8% (official; spoken by 27% of population as a second language), Elomwe 7.6%, Cisena 6.8%, Echuwabo 5.8%, other Mozambican languages 32%, other foreign languages 0.3%, unspecified 1.3% (1997 census)

Education expenditures
6.2% of GDP (2019) Country comparison to the world: 29th

Literacy
definition: age 15 and over can read and write (2015 est.)
total population: 60.7%
male: 72.6%
female: 50.3% (2017)

total population: 56% (2015 est.)
male: 70.8% (2015 est.)
female: 43.1% (2015 est.)

total population: 47.8% (2003 est.), 40.1% (1995 est.)male:  63.5% (2003 est.), 57.7% (1995 est.)female:'' 32.7% (2003 est.), 23.4% (1995 est.)

School life expectancy (primary to tertiary education)
total: 10 years (2017)
male: 10 years (2017)
female: 9 years (2017)

Unemployment, youth ages 15-24
total: 7.4% (2015 est.)
male: 7.7% (2015 est.)
female: 7.1% (2015 est.)

References 

Attribution:

 
Society of Mozambique